Hanne Ørstavik (born 28 November 1969) is a Norwegian writer. She was born in Tana in Finnmark province in the far north of Norway, and moved to Oslo at the age of 16. With the publication of the novel Hakk (Cut) in 1994, Ørstavik embarked her writing career. Her literary breakthrough came three years later with the publication of Kjærlighet (Love), which in 2006 was voted the 6th best Norwegian book of the last 25 years in a poll published by Dagbladet. Since then she has written several novels and received a number of literary prizes.

In 2002, she was awarded the Dobloug Prize for her literary works, and in 2004, the Brage Prize for the novel Presten.

Ørstavik’s books have been translated into 15 languages.

Translations in English
In 2014 Peirene Press published the first ever English translation of one of her novels - The Blue Room - as part of their Coming of Age series.

In 2018 Archipelago Books published Kjærlighet (1997) as Love, translated by Martin Aiken. Her first novel to be published in the United States, Love was shortlisted for the National Book Awards in the category Translated Literature and won the 2019 PEN Translation Prize. Love was published in the UK by And Other Stories in 2019.

Martin Aiken also translated Ørstavik's 2004 novel Presten, which was subsequently published by Archipelago Books in 2021 as The Pastor. Preston won the 2004 Brage Prize for adult fiction.

Bibliography
 1994: Hakk (novel)
 1995: Entropi (novel)
 1997: Kjærlighet (novel)
Love, translated by Martin Aitken (Archipelago Books, USA, 2018) , (And Other Stories, UK, 2019)
 1999: Like sant som jeg er virkelig (novel)
 The Blue Room, translated by Deborah Dawkin (Peirene Press, 2014), 
 2000: Tiden det tar (novel)
 2002: Uke 43 (novel)
 2004: Presten (novel)
The Pastor, translated by Martin Aitken (Archipelago Books, USA, 2021) 
 2006: Kallet - romanen  (novel)
 2007: I morgen skal det være åpent for alle (text)
 2008: Der alt er klart (text and images, in collaboration with the French artist Pierre Duba)
 2009: 48 rue Defacqz (novel)
 2011: Hyenene (novel)
 2013: Det finnes en stor åpen plass i Bordeaux (novel)
 2014: På terrassen i mørket (novel)
 2020: Ti amo (novel)
Ti Amo, translated by Martin Aitken (Archipelago Books, USA, 2022)

Awards 
:no:Tanums kvinnestipend 1998
NRK P2 Listener's Prize 1999, for Like sant som jeg er virkelig
Sult Prize 1999
:no:Havmannprisen 2000, for Tiden det tar
Oktober Prize 2000
Dobloug Prize 2002
Amalie Skram Prize 2002
Klassekampen's Literary Award 2004, for Presten
Brage Prize 2004, for Presten
Aschehoug Prize 2007
PEN Translation Prize 2019, for Love (trans. Martin Aitken)

References

External links

Hanne Ørstavik  at Aschehoug Agency
Hanne Ørstavik  at Forlaget Oktober 

1969 births
Living people
20th-century Norwegian novelists
21st-century Norwegian novelists
Dobloug Prize winners
Norwegian women novelists
21st-century Norwegian women writers
20th-century Norwegian women writers
People from Tana, Norway